Basuva Raju Sundaram is an Indian dance choreographer, actor and director, who works primarily in Tamil and Telugu films. He appeared as an actor in films such as but not limited to: Jeans (1998), 123 (2002),  I Love You Da (2002) and Quick Gun Murugun (2009); and directed one film, Aegan (2008). He is the son of dancer Mugur Sundar, and the elder brother of choreographers Prabhu Deva and Nagendra Prasad.

Choreographers and artists L. L. Cool Jayanth, Ashok Raja, Dinesh, Sridhar, Shobi Paulraj, Baba Bhaskar, Kalyan, Johny, Noble Paul, Prem Rakshith, Jani, Lalitha Shobi, Sathish Krishnan, Viji Sathish, Poppy, Japan Kumar, Sindhuja, Nanditha Jennifer, Raja, Shanthi Arvind, Anusha Swamy and Boopathy had worked as dancers and assistants to him. He won the National Film Award for Best Choreography for his work in the song "Pranamam Pranamam" song from the film Janatha Garage (2016) and "Everest Anchuna" song from the film Maharshi (2019).

Career
Sundaram began his career assisting as a choreographer for his father Mugur Sundar's projects, before going on to lead troupes. He was a dancer in "Rukkumani Rukkumani" from Mani Ratnam's Roja (1992) and in Aasai (1995). He also regularly featured in cameo appearances in songs featuring his brother Prabhu Deva, with the pair making appearances in Shankar's early films Gentleman (1993) and Kadhalan (1994). After being the lead choreographer for a few Kannada films, his first break came through Mani Ratnam's Thiruda Thiruda (1993), where he was given the chance to design dances for three songs. He then went on to become a choreographer of Tamil directors Mani Ratnam and Shankar, and worked on Amitabh Bachchan's album, Aby Baby (1996).

Shankar then offered Sundaram an acting opportunity in his romantic comedy Jeans (1998), where Sundaram played a full-length role. His played the lead in the sports drama I Love You Da (2002) of which  The Hindu stated the film proves "serious acting is simply not his cup of tea". After working on an unreleased film titled Colombus, he then went on to feature in the trilingual One Two Three (2003) alongside his brothers. The film opened to mixed reviews and did not perform well at the box office. He has since primarily operated as a choreographer, making a few exceptions by starring in comic roles in Jeeva's Unnale Unnale (2007), Prabhu Deva's Engeyum Kadhal (2011) and in the Telugu film, Action 3D (2013).

Filmography

Choreographer

 1992 Chembaruthi 
 1992 Pandiyan 
 1992 Bol Radha Bol 
 1993 Walter Vetrivel
 1993 Aagraham 
 1993 Uzhaippali
 1993 Gentleman
 1993 Udan Pirappu
 1993 Kizhakke Varum Paattu
 1993 Thiruda Thiruda 
 1993 Sendhoorapandi 
 1993 Gandharvam 
 1994 Sethupathi IPS 
 1994 Indhu
 1994 Jai Hind
 1994 Duet
 1994 Rasigan 
 1994 Kadhalan 
 1994 May Madham
 1994 Karuththamma
 1994 Criminal
 1995 Gundaraj 
 1995 Bombay
 1995 Coolie
 1995 Karnaa 
 1995 Chinna Vathiyar
 1995 Aasai
 1995 Makkal Aatchi
 1995 Neela Kuyil 
 1995 Ayudha Poojai 
 1995 Barsaat 
 1995 Thotta Chinungi
 1996 Sahasa Veerudu Sagara Kanya
 1996 Majhdhaar
 1996 Love Birds
 1996 Sengottai
 1996 Indian
 1996 Kadhal Desam
 1996 Mr. Romeo 
 1996 Nethaji
 1996 Tu Chor Main Sipahi
 1996 Krishna
 1997 Sakthi
 1997 Mrityudata
 1997 Bhai
 1997 Nerukku Ner
 1997 Ratchagan
 1997 Auzaar
 1997 Ziddi
 1998 Jab Pyaar Kisise Hota Hai
 1998 Jeans
 1998 Aval Varuvala
 1998 Harichandra
 1998 Barood
 1998 Sollamale
 1998 Kannedhirey Thondrinal
 1998 Kadhal Kavithai
 1999 Thulladha Manamum Thullum
 1999 En Swasa Kaatre
 1999 Love You Hamesha
 1999 Ethirum Pudhirum
 1999 Poomagal Oorvalam
 1999 Vaali
 1999 Anantha Poongatre
 1999 Nenjinile 
 1999 Kadhalar Dhinam
 1999 Poovellam Kettuppar
 1999 Kannodu Kanbathellam
 1999 Nee Varuvai Ena
 1999 Jodi
 1999 Kannupada Poguthaiya
 1999 Taj Mahal
 1999 Millennium Stars
 2000 Dada Sahib
 2000 Pukar
 2000 Kannukkul Nilavu
 2000 Good Luck
 2000 Sandhitha Velai
 2000 Kandukondain Kandukondain
 2000 Kushi
 2000 Appu
 2000 Pennin Manathai Thottu
 2000 Parthen Rasithen
 2000 Maayi
 2000 Rhythm
 2000 Priyamaanavale
 2000 Snegithiye
 2001 Albela
 2001 Aks
 2001 Daddy
 2001 Yeh Teraa Ghar Yeh Meraa Ghar
 2001 Friends
 2001 Badri
 2001 Poovellam Un Vasam
 2001 Vedham
 2001 Samudhiram
 2001 12B
 2001 Shajahan
 2001 Kadal Pookkal
 2001 Majunu
 2002 Punnagai Desam
 2002 Red
 2002 Kamarasu
 2002 Thamizhan
 2002 123
 2002 Pyaar Diwana Hota Hai
 2002 Indra
 2002 Youth
 2002 Run
 2002 Arputham
 2002 I Love You Da
 2003 Aasai Aasaiyai
 2003 Parasuram
 2003 Paarai
 2003 Thithikudhe
 2003 Boys
 2003 Alai
 2003 Thirumalai 
 2003 Anjaneya
 2003 Enakku 20 Unakku 18
 2003 Soori
 2003 Tagore
 2004 Udhaya
 2004 Ghilli
 2004 Aethiree
 2004 Madhurey
 2004 Chellamae
 2004 Run
 2004 Attagasam
 2004 Donga Dongadi
 2004 Malliswari
 2004 Kyun! Ho Gaya Na...
 2004 Gudumba Shankar
 2004 Sye
 2004 Shankar Dada MBBS
 2004 Hulchul
 2005 Netaji Subhas Chandra Bose: The Forgotten Hero
 2005 Thirupaachi
 2005 Ji
 2005 Maayavi
 2005 Chandramukhi 
 2005 Sachein
 2005 Ullam Ketkumae
 2005 Anniyan
 2005 Ponniyin Selvan
 2005 Oru Naal Oru Kanavu
 2005 Athadu
 2005 Ghajini
 2005 No Entry
 2005 Dil Jo Bhi Kahey...
 2005 Majaa
 2005 Sandakozhi
 2005 Jai Chiranjeeva
 2006 Kalvanin Kadhali
 2006 Kusthi 
 2006 Lakshmi
 2006 Happy
 2006 Unakkum Enakkum
 2006 Varalaru: The History of Godfather 
 2006 Thiruvilaiyaadal Aarambam
 2006 Bangaram
 2006 Stalin
 2006 Rakhi 
 2007 Pokkiri
 2007 Godava
 2007 Unnale Unnale
 2007 Desamuduru
 2007 Sivaji: The Boss
 2007 Thottal Poo Malarum
 2007 Aarya
 2007 Marudhamalai
 2007 Lakshyam
 2007 Yamadonga
 2007 Tulasi
 2008 Dhaam Dhoom
 2008 Aegan
 2009 Villu
 2009 Ayan
 2009 Ek Niranjan
 2009 Wanted
 2010 Aasal
 2010 Theeradha Vilaiyattu Pillai
 2010 Kacheri Arambam
 2010 Paiyaa
 2010 Don Seenu 
 2010 Sura
 2010 Khaleja
 2010 Enthiran: The Robot
 2010 Brindavanam
 2011 Kaavalan 
 2011 Mappillai
 2011 Engeyum Kadhal
 2012 Vettai
 2012 Billa II
 2012 Julai
 2013 Alex Pandian
 2013 Singam II
 2013 Chennai Express
 2013 Pattathu Yaanai
 2013 Idharkuthane Aasaipattai Balakumara 
 2013 All in All Azhagu Raja
 2013 Endrendrum Punnagai
 2013 Biriyani
 2013 Bhai
 2014 Jilla
 2014 Bramman
 2014 Ennamo Nadakkudhu
 2014 Kochadaiiyaan
 2014 Anjaan
 2014 Sigaram Thodu
 2014 Mukunda
 2014 Kaaviya Thalaivan
 2015 Srimanthudu
 2015 Bajrangi Bhaijaan
 2015 Anegan
 2015 Kaaki Sattai
 2015 Inimey Ippadithaan
 2015 Kaaval
 2015 Run Raja Run
 2015 Jill
 2015 Puli
 2015 Size Zero
 2015 Temper
 2016 Nannaku Prematho
 2016 Saagasam Enra Veerachayal
 2016 Thozha
 2016 Natpadhigaram 79
 2016 24
 2016 Express Raja
 2016 Enakku Innoru Per Irukku
 2016 Janatha Garage
 2016 Remo
 2016 Rekka
 2016 Kaashmora
 2016 Brahmotsavam
 2016 Balle Vellaiyathevaa 
 2017 Bogan
 2017 Kadamban
 2017 Kaadhali
 2017 Winner
 2017 Kodi Veeran
 2017 Sakka Podu Podu Raja
 2018 Mannar Vagera
 2018 Junga
 2018 Aravinda Sametha Veera Raghava
 2018 Sandakozhi 2
 2018 Bharat Ane Nenu
 2019 Irupathiyonnaam Noottaandu
 2019 Saaho
 2019 Rustum
 2019 Maharshi
 2019 Pailwaan
 2019 Sanga Thamizhan
 2019 Seeru
 2019 Hero
 2020 Darbar
 2020 Ka Pae Ranasingam
 2020 Kalathil Santhippom
 2021 Krack
 2021 Tughlaq Durbar
 2021 Raja Vamsam
 2021 Republic
 2021 Maanaadu
 2021 Kotigobba 3
 2022 Bommai
 2022 Bagheera
 2022 Varalaru Mukkiyam
 2022 The Legend
 2022 Coffee with Kadhal
 2023 Varisu
 2023 Varalaru Mukkiyam

Director

Actor

Dancer

Awards
Won
 1994 Tamil Nadu State Film Award for Best Choreographer -Kadhalan
 1997 Dinakaran Award for Best Dance Director - Many movies
 1998 Tamil Nadu State Film Award for Best Choreographer - Jeans
 1998 Dinakaran Award for Best Dance Director - Many movies
 1999 Dinakaran Award for Best Dance Master - Many movies
 1999 Cinema Express Award for Best Dance Master - Many movies
 2000 Dinakaran Award for Best Dance Master - Many movies
 2004 Dinakaran-Medimix Award for Best Choreographer - Ghilli
 2004 Filmfare Award for Best Dance Choreographer – South - Ghilli
 2009 Ananda Vikatan Cinema Award for Best Choreographer - Villu
 2010 Tamil Nadu State Film Award for Best Choreographer - Paiyaa
 2011 Ananda Vikatan Cinema Award for Best Choreographer - Engeyum Kadhal
 2013 Edison Award for Best Choreographer - Biriyani
2016 National Film Award for Best Choreography-Janatha Garage
2019 National Film Award for Best Choreography-Maharshi
Nominated 
 2007 Vijay Award for Best Choreographer - Unnale Unnale
 2010 Vijay Award for Best Choreographer - Enthiran
 2011 Vijay Award for Best Choreographer - Engeyum Kadhal
 2014 South Indian International Movie Award for Best Dance Choreographer - Anjaan
 2014 Vijay Award for Best Choreographer - Kaaviya Thalaivan

References

External links
 

Male actors in Tamil cinema
Indian film choreographers
Tamil film directors
Indian male film actors
Living people
1968 births
Filmfare Awards South winners
20th-century Indian dancers
21st-century Indian dancers
20th-century Indian male actors
21st-century Indian male actors
Best Choreography National Film Award winners